Musian (also Romanized as Mūsīān and Mūsīyān; also known as Mūsyūn) is a village in Abrisham Rural District, in the Central District of Falavarjan County, Isfahan Province, Iran. At the 2006 census, its population was 1,478, in 373 families.

References 

Populated places in Falavarjan County